Lepidocharax is a genus of characins endemic to the Doce, Paraguaçu and São Francisco basins in eastern Brazil.

Species
There are currently two recognized species in this genus:

 Lepidocharax burnsi K. M. Ferreira, Menezes & Quagio-Grassioto, 2011
 Lepidocharax diamantina K. M. Ferreira, Menezes & Quagio-Grassioto, 2011

References

Characidae
Fish of South America
Fish of Brazil
Endemic fauna of Brazil